Kabardian may refer to:

 Kabardians, a Circassian tribe of the Northwest Caucasus
 Kabardian language, the Northwest Caucasian language spoken by them
 Kabardian horse, a breed originating from the same region

See also
 Kabardino-Balkaria, a republic in North Caucasus, federal subject of Russia

Language and nationality disambiguation pages